Superstation is a term in North American broadcasting that has several meanings. 

Superstation may also refer to:

 The Superstation, a British overnight sustaining service for Independent Local Radio
 The Superstation Orkney, a Scottish community radio station
 Superstation TBS, an American TV channel
 Superstation WGN, now NewsNation, an American subscription television network 
 910 AM Superstation, WFDF (AM), an American radio station

See also

 Superstition